Mela (Miller) was the name Native Hawaiians called Alexander (Alika) Miller Sr., the foreign mason of Kamehameha I and chief builder of the Brick Palace who was on Oahu before the Battle of Nuʻuanu in 1795.

Brick Palace

Before the Battle of Nuuanu a number of foreigners were living on Oahu under the rule of Kalanikūpule. Among these settlers were Oliver Holmes, Shomisona, Mr. Lele, Mr. Mela [Miller] and Mr. Keakaʻeleʻele [Black Jack]. After Kamehameha I conquered Oahu they all pledged oaths to the new alii. A letter from William Richards to Reverend Levi Chamberlain dated September 18, 1830, describes "Miller" as a Mason living in Lahaina. Richard also notes that "Miller" likes rum. 

Mela, along with Mr. Keka'ele'ele (Black Jack), possibly the first African American in Hawaii, built the Brick Palace for Kamehameha I's favorite wife, Kaʻahumanu. The palace was the first western-style structure built in the Hawaiian Islands, serving as the first Royal Palace. Located at Lahaina, Maui, the site became the seat of government and capital of the Kingdom of Hawaii until 1845. William Richards would later receive the land the Brick Palace was built on.

John Papa ʻĪʻī
Mela was the kahu (royal attendant) of John Papa ʻĪʻī, who writes of the occasion when, as a young boy who didn't wish to walk on a long journey, his attendants, either Mela or Kiwalao, scared him into walking by pointing to foreigners and telling the young boy; "Here come the haoles, who do not like children who cry too much".

Family, descendants and legacy
Mela's English name was Alexander (Alika) Miller Sr. Alexander wed or cohabitated with Kānekapōlei and had two children, a girl named Kahinu (w) and a son named Alika (Alexander) Mela (Miller) Jr. While Mela was originally gifted with several lots of land from Kamehameha I, his son Alika had to relinquish all but one, Opaeula ahupuaa in Lahaina, Maui.

Alika married Kanuha Kaialiilii, sister of Captain J.H. Mahiai, in 1855. Kanuha and Mahiai were two of 9 children of Kaialiilii and Poimoa. Alika and Kanuha had eight children;

 Kale [Sarah] (w)
 John Mahiʻai (born Miller) Kāneakua
 Hale
 Kahalea
 Kanekapolei (w)
 Isabel/Isabella Haleʻala Kaʻili Desha (née Miller) (w)
 Noa
 Kalimahana

Sarah Miller is said to have married or cohabitated with a Mr. Harvey Raymond but there was no issue from the union. Sarah did have 4 children with Charles Makee, including a son named Charles Miller. John Mahiʻai was hanai adopted by James Kāneakua. He married twice. His first marriage produced no issue however, his second marriage to Lucy Kaʻumealani Cummings produced ten children.

Family tree

Citations

References
 
 
 
 
 
 
 
 

Hawaiian nobility
Royalty of the Hawaiian Kingdom
People from Lahaina, Hawaii
Nobility of the Americas